A protest permit to hold  or parade permit is permission granted by a governmental agency for a demonstration to be held in a particular venue at a particular time. Failing to obtain a permit may lead to charges of parading without a permit. The requirement of a permit is sometimes denounced as an infringement of free speech, as permits are denied on spurious grounds or protestors are corralled into free speech zones. Permits are sometimes denied on grounds that the protest will create a security risk. There seems to be evidence that the available venues for protests are shrinking in number; that citizens have experienced increasing difficulty in gaining unrestricted access to them; and that such venues are no longer where most people typically congregate in large numbers. In Washington, DC, the National Park Service Police, U.S. Capitol Police, and Metropolitan Police of the District of Columbia have an elaborate permitting system. Many famous people such as Martin Luther King Jr. have been arrested for protesting without a permit.

Amnesty International's spokesperson declares: "A forbidding of a protest is legal on an international point of view only if it is motivated for a precise threat, and only if there is no other available general restriction to maintain order"

Per country

France 
In France many protests have been forbidden. Israelian conflict related protests have been routinely forbidden. Security risks have been brought for it, with a focus at protecting Jewish communities, which have undergone some attacks. Also, the aim was to avoid confrontation between pro-israelian and pro-palestinian protesters. Jean-Luc-Mélenchon of left wing party of La France insoumise declared " "France is the only country where all support protests for palestinians are forbidden, and protests against israelian far-right government, it is obviously to create power incidendents and stigmatise that cause".

Covid-19

As to forbid general protests 
During the covid outbreak the need to prevent gathering has been used regularly to forbid protests.

About covid-19 restrictions 
Such as a BLM protest in Ireland where the government tweeted that it had been in Dublin was forbidden on 3 June 2020. Many protests also occurred against covid restrictions or about the response given to the virus.

See also
Free speech zone
Riot control

References

Protests